Cecil Lee Creen (c. 1897 – February 20, 1934) was a college football player.

University of Alabama
Creen was a prominent quarterback for the Alabama Crimson Tide of the University of Alabama.

1916
In an 80 to 0 win over Southern University in 1916, Goree Johnson and Cecil Creen each scored four touchdowns. The next week, Creen ran in the touchdown to defeat Mississippi College 7 to 6. For the game against Ole Miss, Alabama's 1916 season recap reads "Alabama defeated the University of Mississippi at Tuscaloosa by the score of 27 to 0 with Creen again being the star on the offense." He was selected All-Southern, and was given honorable mention from Walter Camp.

Washington & Lee
He transferred to Washington & Lee.

References

Alabama Crimson Tide football players
American football quarterbacks
All-Southern college football players
Players of American football from Alabama
Sportspeople from Anniston, Alabama
1934 deaths